(DDR X2) is a music video game, and a part of the Dance Dance Revolution series. The arcade version of DDR X2 was revealed by Konami on November 20, 2009. The sequel to Dance Dance Revolution X, X2 began public beta testing on November 25, 2009. The game was released in Japan and Asia on July 7, 2010, North America on December 31, 2010, and Europe on May 13, 2011. It was the last arcade installment of Dance Dance Revolution with international releases until Dance Dance Revolution A.

Development
The first public location test for Dance Dance Revolution X2 was announced by Konami on November 20, 2009, to be held from the 25th to December 3, 2009 in Akihabara, Tokyo. The location test revealed new features such as a redesigned song selection interface, new adjustable versions of the Sudden and Hidden modifiers, and the ability to adjust these settings and the speed of the arrows in-game using the control buttons on the cabinet. The location test version did not contain an Extra Stage song, but "POSSESSION" was accessible on the build if certain conditions were met.

Features

A redesigned Cover Flow-like song list. This design is based on DDR Universe 3.
New "Happy" and "Pro" play modes. Happy mode is designed for beginners, with a simplified interface and reduced song list. Pro is basically the "normal" mode.
Two new options have been added. The first are HIDDEN+ and SUDDEN+, which are alternate versions of HIDDEN and SUDDEN that can be activated using the up and down buttons on the cabinet. The second is the RISKY option, which gives the player one life bar (like in ENCORE EXTRA STAGE); it is only available when playing SINGLE or DOUBLE mode. If the player missteps, the stage will end and skip to the next stage. This is useful for the players who want to achieve higher scores. In addition, SPEED can also be adjusted using the up and down buttons on the cabinet.
 PASELI digital payment system
 MARATHON MODE, exclusive for PASELI owners. Players can play up to 7 stages using the PASELI e-money system. Certain CHALLENGE charts for songs are also only available in this mode.
BATTLE MODE has been removed from the game.
Step Rating BOO is renamed back to MISS and merged with N.G. ALMOST have been removed entirely (its window has been merged with GOOD)

A total of 17 characters are available in X2, featuring new costumes. Two characters, Rena and Rinon, make their first arcade appearance. The other 15 characters are from DDR X. Rinon can appear in one of seven colors by selecting the Replicant-D Action folder. In X2 and subsequent releases, the character selection screen and accessories are only accessible on the e-Amusement website. The game defaults to selecting a random character when choosing a song.

Extra Stage

Extra Stage
The Extra Stage system in this game has been changed. The player must obtain performance grade of AA or AAA from the First Stage to a Final Stage to reach Extra Stage. There are no longer songs exclusive to Final Stage that are required to access Extra Stage as with previous versions. The special song available in Extra Stage is KIMONO PRINCESS, but the difficulty ratings of the chart is based on the sum of difficulty ratings and the number of stages on the credit. The list is as follows.

The Extra Stage uses Battery Dance Meter; its quantity of lives is 4. The players can choose options for Extra Stage.

Encore Extra Stage
To access Encore Extra Stage, the player needs to get AA or better on KIMONO PRINCESS on Expert during Extra Stage. Unlike previous version where the players may choose any song, Encore Extra Stages have been reverted to the style in DDR MAX, where only a specific song can be played. The song is (by default) Roppongi EVOLVED on Expert. The version of the song is chosen randomly. Players are still able to set options before challenging Encore Extra Stage.

Replicant D-Action
For Replicant D-Action, each song has different requirements to access. 
 Pierce The Sky is accessed by passing at least 20 songs in the X2 folder. 
 Sakura Sunrise is accessed by passing at least 2 songs in each song folder (at least 24 songs). 
 Shiny World is accessed by passing 6 courses and 1 drill course. 
 POSSESSION is accessed by getting at least 100 difficulty ratings on CHALLENGE difficulty, and scoring AA or better on Pierce The Sky and Sakura Sunrise on the same difficulty. 
 New Decade is accessed by getting a full combo on 15 different song charts (same songs can have multiple full combos on separate difficulties), and scoring AA or better on Sakura Sunrise and Shiny World on the same difficulty. 
 Anti-Matter is accessed by playing Trial Mode 3 times, and scoring AA or better on Pierce The Sky and Shiny World on the same difficulty. (Note that POSSESSION, New Decade, and Anti-Matter's difficulty depends on what difficulties the player plays on previous songs). 
Scoring AA or better on each song will net a medal.

When the player subsequently earns all six, the player immediately will access the special Encore Extra Stage, Valkyrie dimension on Expert. The player is forced to play the song immediately, which means they cannot change options or take a break.

Release
Dance Dance Revolution X2 was released on December 31, 2010 in the United States. Internationally, Dance Dance Revolution X2 was imported in Canada on December 5, 2011 at the Funhaven amusement centre in Ottawa, Ontario. As of August 2019, this is the sole venue in Canada to feature this game, after a competitor withdrew an upgraded machine.

New cabinets, and Dance Dance Revolution X upgrades, feature a 37" monitor at 720p. Legacy cabinets, initially running SuperNova 2 or an older release, feature a 29" monitor at 480p.

Music
There are 83 new songs featured in X2 (81 new songs in the North American and European releases). 17 out of 19 licensed songs from Dance Dance Revolution SuperNova and 10 out of 13 from Dance Dance Revolution SuperNova 2 have been removed due to their licenses expiring. The licensed material from Dance Dance Revolution X remains, including tracks from the Dancemania compilation series, as well as A Different Drum records. Four classic licensed songs from earlier DDR mixes have also returned in remastered form, along with a special remixed license track. The first location test build contained 14 new songs, plus one secret song, POSSESSION, which had special conditions required in order to be unlocked. Three additional songs were added on an updated build installed several days after the testing began.

In the 2010 Japanese Arcade Operators Union expo (AOU2010), Konami showed a newer build of the game. This newer version showcased even more new songs, including additional material from other BEMANI music games.

The final release of the build revealed many new unlocks, special remixes by Konami artists, and song revivals. The licenses include selections by well known Japanese and Western artists. This the very first DDR arcade release to include licenses from the Cyber Trance series of albums. It is also the first time that Super Eurobeat tracks have been featured in a DDR game since Dancing Stage featuring Disney's Rave. Other songs have been ported over from the latest PlayStation 2, Wii, and Xbox 360 DDR releases. There are a total of 444 songs in this game (442 songs in the North American and European releases).

A total of four songs, all which debuted in Dance Dance Revolution Hottest Party 3 for the Wii, are exclusive to Dance Dance Revolution X2 in arcades:
 "Bonafied Lovin" by Chromeo
 "Daft Punk Is Playing at My House" by LCD Soundsystem 💿
 "Feel Good Inc." by Gorillaz
 "Ice Ice Baby" by Vanilla Ice 💿

In addition, a total of 16 songs are exclusive to Dance Dance Revolution X and X2 in arcades.

One of the new features included in the main game mode is a special Extra Stage system. Known as Replicant D-Action, this mode allows players to choose from a set of 6 difficult songs, 3 level 14's (slower songs) and 3 level 17's (faster + tempo change songs). When a player gets rank AA or more one of these songs (any difficulty), they receive a medal for that particular track. When players subsequently earn all 6 medals, they can access the Encore Extra Stage, Valkyrie dimension (Expert). Valkyrie dimension is known as the first song in the series that is harder than the Extra Stage despite the latter having one life, let alone the most difficult song in the entire series.

On March 23, 2011, Konami introduced a special promotion called APPEND Festival. This allowed players to unlock 2 special songs for 5 BEMANI games, including DDR X2 and the recently released upgrade version of jubeat knit, jubeat knit APPEND. However, these songs are not available in the North American and European versions of the game due to the lack of e-Amusement in those regions.

The PlayStation 2 version of Dance Dance Revolution X2 was released in 2009, prior to the arcade version. It includes 60 songs, including 19 which made their arcade debut in X2. Another 25 songs originate from older releases, but are also available in X2 for the arcade, for a total of 44 common songs in both versions of X2. The remaining 16 songs are console exclusives.

{|class="wikitable collapsible collapsed"
|-
! colspan="3" | Dance Dance Revolution X2 arcade song list
|-
! style="background:#fff;"|Song
! style="background:#fff;"|Artist
! style="background:#fff;"|Other Information
|-
! colspan="3" style="background:#fff;"|Licensed Songs (21 total)
|- style="background:#ffff88;"
|"Be your wings" 🎬
|GIRL NEXT DOOR
|from the album Next Future
|- style="background:#ffff88;"
|"Bonafied Lovin'" 🎬
|Chromeo
|from Dance Dance Revolution Hottest Party 3from the album Fancy Footwork
|- style="background:#ffff88;"
|"CAPTAIN JACK (GRANDALE REMIX)"
|CAPTAIN JACK
|from Dancemania SPEED 2original cut from Dance Dance Revolution 3rdMix
|- style="background:#ffff88;"
|"DAFT PUNK IS PLAYING AT MY HOUSE" 🎬 💿
|LCD Soundsystem
|from the album LCD Soundsystem
|- style="background:#ffff88;"
|"DAM DARIRAM"
|JOGA
|from Dancemania X3original cut from Dance Dance Revolution 3rdMix
|- style="background:#ffff88;"
|"ETERNITY"
|ALEKY
|from Super Eurobeat Vol. 199
|- style="background:#ffff88;"
|"Everytime We Touch" 🎬
|Cascada
|from Dance Dance Revolution Universefrom the album Everytime We Touch
|- style="background:#ffff88;"
|"EZ DO DANCE" 🎬
|TRF
|from the album EZ DO DANCE
|- style="background:#ffff88;"
|"Feel Good Inc." 🎬
|Gorillaz
|from Dance Dance Revolution Hottest Party 3from the album Demon Days
|- style="background:#ffff88;"
|"HERO"
|PAPAYA
|from Dance Dance Revolution X (NA PS2)from Dancemania EXTRAoriginal cut from Dance Dance Revolution 2ndMix
|- style="background:#ffff88;"
|"Hide-away" 🎬
|AAA
|from the album Heartful
|- style="background:#ffff88;"
|"ICE ICE BABY" 💿
|VANILLA ICE
|from the album To the Extreme|- style="background:#ffff88;"
|"IF YOU WERE HERE"
|JENNIFER
|from Dancemania EXTRAoriginal cut from Dance Dance Revolution 2ndMix|- style="background:#ffff88;"
|"IF YOU WERE HERE(L.E.D.-G STYLE REMIX)" 🔒
|JENNIFER
|Exclusive remix|- style="background:#ffff88;"
|"more more more"
|capsule
|from jubeat ripplesfrom the album More! More! More!|- style="background:#ffff88;"
|"only my railgun" 🎬
|fripSide
|from the album Infinite SynthesisOpening theme of とある科学の超電磁砲|- style="background:#ffff88;"
|"resonance"
|NAOKI-EX
|from Dance Dance Revolution Furu Furu Party (JP Wii)cover of the opening theme of ソウルイーター|- style="background:#ffff88;"
|"Super Driver" 🎬
|平野綾
|from the album Speed StarOpening theme of 涼宮ハルヒの憂鬱|- style="background:#ffff88;"
|"SUPER EUROBEAT <GOLD MIX>"
|DAVE RODGERS feat. FUTURA
|from SUPER EUROBEAT VOL.201 - COLLABORATION OF EUROBEAT|- style="background:#ffff88;"
|"TENSHI" 🎬
|GOURYELLA
|
|- style="background:#ffff88;"
|"Time After Time" 🎬
|Novaspace
|from the album Supernovacover of Cyndi Lauper|-
! colspan="3" style="background:#fff;"|Konami Original Songs (10 total)
|- style="background:#6f6;"
|"All My Love" 🎬 (BG) 🔒
|kors k feat.ЯIRE
|New Konami Original|- style="background:#6f6;"
|"CG Project" 🔒
|Latenighters
|New Konami Original|- style="background:#6f6;"
|"Decade" 🎬 (BG) 🔒
|kors k VS. dj TAKA
|New Konami Original|- style="background:#6f6;"
|"KISS KISS KISS 秋葉工房 MIX"(KISS KISS KISS Akiba Kōubōu MIX) 🎬 (BG) 🔒
|Remixed by DJ Command
|New Konami Original|- style="background:#6f6;"
|"Poseidon (kors k mix)" 🎬 (BG) 🔒
|NAOKI Underground
|New Konami Original|- style="background:#6f6;"
|"☆shining☆" 🎬 (BG)
|ピンクターボ
|New Konami Original|- style="background:#6f6;"
|"Sky Is The Limit" 🎬 (BG) 🔒
|Sota F. feat. ANNA
|New Konami Original|- style="background:#6f6;"
|"someday..." 🎬 (BG)
|杏野はるな
|New Konami Original|- style="background:#6f6;"
|"Theory of Eternity" 🔒
|TAG
|New Konami Original|- style="background:#6f6;"
|"WH1TE RO5E" 🎬 (BG) 🔒
|Y&Co.
|New Konami Original|-
! colspan="3" style="background:#fff;"|From Console Version (25 total)
|- style="background:#afc;"
|"888" 🔒
|DJ TECHNORCH
|from Dance Dance Revolution Universe 3|- style="background:#afc;"
|"A Brighter Day"
|NAOKI feat. Aleisha G.
|from Dance Dance Revolution S+|- style="background:#afc;"
|"aftershock!!" 🔒
|DM Ashura
|from Dance Dance Revolution Universe 3|- style="background:#afc;"
|"Crazy Control" 🔒 💿
|D-crew with VAL TIATIA
|
|- style="background:#afc;"
|"ΔMAX" 🎬
|DM Ashura
|from Dance Dance Revolution Universe 3|- style="background:#afc;"
|"dirty digital" 🔒
|kors k
|from Dance Dance Revolution Universe 3|- style="background:#afc;"
|"Dummy" 🔒
|RAM
|from Dance Dance Revolution Universe 3|- style="background:#afc;"
|"Freeze" 🔒 💿
|nc ft. NRG Factory
|
|- style="background:#afc;"
|"Gotta Dance" 🔒 💿
|NAOKI feat. Aleisha G
|
|- style="background:#afc;"
|"Heatstroke" 💿
|TAG feat. Angie Lee
|
|- style="background:#afc;"
|"in love wit you" 🔒
|Kotaro feat. Aya
|from Dance Dance Revolution X (JP PS2)|- style="background:#afc;"
|"La libertad" 🔒 💿
|Cherryl Horrocks
|
|- style="background:#afc;"
|"La receta" 🔒 💿
|Carlos Coco Garcia
|
|- style="background:#afc;"
|"Love Again" 🔒 💿
|NM feat. Mr. E
|
|- style="background:#afc;"
|"oarfish"
|kors k
|from Dance Dance Revolution Universe 3|- style="background:#afc;"
|"Pluto The First" 🔒 💿
|WHITE WALL
|from Dance Dance Revolution Hottest Party (JP Wii)|- style="background:#afc;"
|"real-high-SPEED" 🔒
|Makoto feat. SK
|from Dance Dance Revolution X (JP PS2)|- style="background:#afc;"
|"Sacred Oath" 💿
|TЁЯRA
|
|- style="background:#afc;"
|"sakura storm" 🎬 (BG)
|Ryu☆
|from Dance Dance Revolution Universe 3|- style="background:#afc;"
|"Shine" 💿
|TOMOSUKE feat. Adreana
|
|- style="background:#afc;"
|"Taking It To The Sky" 🔒 💿
|U1 feat. Tammy S Hansen
|
|- style="background:#afc;"
|"THIS NIGHT" 🔒 💿
|jun feat. Sonnet
|
|- style="background:#afc;"
|"What Will Come Of Me" 🔒 💿
|Black Rose Garden
|
|- style="background:#afc;"
|"You Are A Star" 💿
|NAOKI feat. Anna Kaelin
|
|- style="background:#afc;"
|"Your Angel" 🔒
|DM Ashura feat. kors k
|from Dance Dance Revolution Universe 3|- style="background:#bb88ff;"
! colspan="3" style="background:#fff;"|BEMANI Crossover Songs (18 total)
|- style="background:#9cf;"
|"BALLAD THE FEATHERS" 🎬 (BG)
|Arata Iiyoshi|SHIN SOUND DESIGN feat. Naomi Koizumi
|from beatmania IIDX 13 DistorteD|- style="background:#9cf;"
|"Dazzlin' Darlin" 🎬
|HHH
|from beatmania IIDX 15 DJ TROOPERS|- style="background:#9cf;"
|"Dazzlin' Darlin-秋葉工房 mix-"(Dazzlin' Darlin-Akiba Kōubōu mix-) 🔒
|Remixed by DJ Command
|from beatmania IIDX 17 SIRIUS|- style="background:#9cf;"
|"DROP" 🎬 🔒
|dj TAKA feat. Kanako Hoshino
|from beatmania IIDX 17 SIRIUS|- style="background:#9cf;"
|"FIRE FIRE" 🎬 (BG) 🔒
|StripE
|from beatmania IIDX 14 GOLD|- style="background:#9cf;"
|"不沈艦 CANDY"(Fuchinkan CANDY) 🎬 (BG)
|Risk Junk
|from beatmania IIDX 16 EMPRESS|- style="background:#9cf;"
|"going up" 🎬 🔒
|Takayuki Ishikawa|colors
|from GuitarFreaks V & DrumMania V|- style="background:#9cf;"
|"GOLD RUSH" 🎬 🔒
|DJ YOSHITAKA-G feat. Michael a la mode
|from beatmania IIDX 14 GOLD|- style="background:#9cf;"
|"I'm so Happy"
|Ryu☆
|from jubeat knit|- style="background:#9cf;"
|"Leaving..." 🎬 (BG)
|seiya-murai meets "eimy"
|from beatmania IIDX 13 DistorteD|- style="background:#9cf;"
|"MAX LOVE"
|DJ Yoshitaka feat. 星野奏子
|from beatmania IIDX 15 DJ TROOPERS|- style="background:#9cf;"
|"冥"(Mei) 🎬 (BG) 🔒
|Amuro vs. Killer
|from beatmania IIDX 12 HAPPY SKY|- style="background:#9cf;"
|"Melody Life"
|Noria
|from beatmania IIDX 13 DistorteD|- style="background:#9cf;"
|"Second Heaven" 🎬 (BG)
|Ryu☆
|from beatmania IIDX 14 GOLD|- style="background:#9cf;"
|"She is my wife" 🎬
|SUPER STAR 満-MITSURU-
|from beatmania IIDX 17 SIRIUS|- style="background:#9cf;"
|"smooooch ・∀・" 🎬
|kors k
|from beatmania IIDX 16 EMPRESS|- style="background:#9cf;"
|"VANESSA" 🎬 (BG) 🔒
|朱雀
|from beatmania IIDX 14 GOLD|- style="background:#9cf;"
|"ZETA ~素数の世界と超越者~"(ZETA ~Sosūu no Sekai to Chōuetsusha~) 🎬 (BG) 🔒
|Zektbach
|from pop'n music 15 ADVENTURE|- style="background:#bb88ff;"
! colspan="3" style="background:#fff;"|Boss Songs (2 total)
|- style="background:#f42;"
|"KIMONO PRINCESS" 🎬 (BG) 🔒 💿
|jun
|Accessible as EXTRA STAGE|- style="background:#f42;"
|"roppongi EVOLVED" 🎬 (BG) 💿 🔒
|TAG underground
|Versions A, B, C and D availableVersion D: New Konami Original Accessible as ENCORE EXTRA STAGE|-
! colspan="3" style="background:#fff;"|Replicant D-Action Songs (7 total)
|- style="background:#f5f;"
|"Pierce the Sky" 🎬 (BG) 🔒
|JAKAZiD feat. K.N.
|New Konami OriginalAccessible as EXTRA STAGE#1|- style="background:#f5f;"
|"Sakura Sunrise" 🎬 (BG) 🔒
|Ryu☆
|New Konami OriginalAccessible as EXTRA STAGE#2|- style="background:#f5f;"
|"Shiny World" 🎬 (BG) 🔒
|CAPACITY GATE
|New Konami OriginalAccessible as EXTRA STAGE#3|- style="background:#f5f;"
|"New Decade" 🎬 (BG) 🔒
|Sota F.
|New Konami OriginalAccessible as EXTRA STAGE#4|- style="background:#f5f;"
|"Anti-Matter" 🎬 (BG) 🔒
|Orbit1 & Milo
|New Konami OriginalAccessible as EXTRA STAGE#5|- style="background:#f5f;"
|"POSSESSION" 🎬 (BG) 🔒
|TAG underground
|New Konami OriginalAccessible as EXTRA STAGE#6|- style="background:#f5f;"
|"Valkyrie dimension" 🎬 (BG) 🔒
|Spriggan
|New Konami OriginalAccessible as ENCORE EXTRA STAGE|- style="background:#bb88ff;"
! colspan="3" style="background:#fff;"|Newly Revived Songs (9 total)
|- style="background:#fff;"
|"Freedom" 🔒
|BeForU
|from Dance Dance Revolution SuperNova|- style="background:#fff;"
|"ヒマワリ"(Himawari) 🔒
|RIYU from BeForU
|from Dance Dance Revolution SuperNova|- style="background:#fff;"
|"Under the Sky" 🔒
|南さやか(BeForU) with platoniX
|from Dance Dance Revolution SuperNova|- style="background:#fff;"
|"GRADUATION ～それぞれの明日～ "(GRADUATION ~Sorezore no Ashita) 🔒
|BeForU
|from Dance Dance Revolution Extreme|- style="background:#fff;"
|"LOVE♥SHINE" 🔒
|小坂りゆ
|from Dance Dance Revolution Extreme|- style="background:#fff;"
|"♥LOVE²シュガ→♥"(♥LOVE² Sugar→♥)
|dj TAKA feat. のりあ
|from Dance Dance Revolution Extreme|- style="background:#fff;"
|"TEARS" 🔒
|NAOKI underground feat. EK
|from Dance Dance Revolution Extreme|- style="background:#fff;"
|"BREAK DOWN!" 🔒
|BeForU
|from DDRMAX2 Dance Dance Revolution 7thMix|- style="background:#fff;"
|"CANDY♥" 🔒
|小坂りゆ
|from DDRMAX2 Dance Dance Revolution 7thMix|- style="background:#bb88ff;"
! colspan="3" style="background:#fff;"|Removed Songs (39 total)
|- style="background:#999;"
|"HOW TO PLAY"
|MC X
|from Dance Dance Revolution X|- style="background:#999;"
|"Xmix1 (Midnight Dawn)"
|dj jiggens
|from Dance Dance Revolution X|- style="background:#999;"
|"Xmix2 (Beats 'n Bangs)"
|DJ Inhabit
|from Dance Dance Revolution X|- style="background:#999;"
|"Xmix3 (Stomp Dem Groove)"
|DJ nagi
|from Dance Dance Revolution X|- style="background:#999;"
|"Xmix4 (Linear Momentum)"
|dj jiggens
|from Dance Dance Revolution X|- style="background:#999;"
|"Xmix5 (Overcrush)"
|DJ Inhabit
|from Dance Dance Revolution X|- style="background:#999;"
|"AIN'T NO MOUNTAIN HIGH ENOUGH"
|SLOTH MUSIC PROJECT feat. MALAYA
|from Dance Dance Revolution SuperNova 2|- style="background:#999;"
|"Burn Baby Burn"
|SLOTH MUSIC PROJECT feat. ANDY L.
|from Dance Dance Revolution SuperNova 2|- style="background:#999;"
|"COME CLEAN"
|NM featuring Susan Z
|from Dance Dance Revolution SuperNova 2|- style="background:#999;"
|"FAINT"
|PEGASUS
|from Dance Dance Revolution SuperNova 2|- style="background:#999;"
|"ME AGAINST THE MUSIC"
|HELEN
|from Dance Dance Revolution SuperNova 2|- style="background:#999;"
|"My Favorite Things"
|SLOTH MUSIC PROJECT feat. ALISON WADE
|from Dance Dance Revolution SuperNova 2|- style="background:#999;"
|"SUNRISE (JASON NEVINS REMIX)"
|DURAN DURAN
|from Dance Dance Revolution SuperNova 2|- style="background:#999;"
|"TWO MONTHS OFF"
|TECHNO MASTERS
|from Dance Dance Revolution SuperNova 2|- style="background:#999;"
|"Unbelievable"
|EMF
|from Dance Dance Revolution SuperNova 2|- style="background:#999;"
|"WAITING FOR TONIGHT"
|P.A.T
|from Dance Dance Revolution SuperNova 2|- style="background:#999;"
|"A LOVE LIKE THIS"
|PANDORA
|from Dance Dance Revolution SuperNova|- style="background:#999;"
|"CENTERFOLD (130BPM move it remix)"
|CAPTAIN JACK
|from Dance Dance Revolution SuperNova|- style="background:#999;"
|"DA CAPO"
|ACE OF BASE
|from Dance Dance Revolution SuperNova|- style="background:#999;"
|"DOESN'T REALLY MATTER"
|JANET JACKSON
|from Dance Dance Revolution SuperNova|- style="background:#999;"
|"DYNAMITE RAVE -super euro version-" 
|NAOKI with Y&Co.
|from Dance Dance Revolution SuperNova|- style="background:#999;"
|"FEELS JUST LIKE IT SHOULD"
|LH MUSIC CREATION
|from Dance Dance Revolution SuperNova|- style="background:#999;"
|"GIRL IN A DAYDREAM"
|PANDORA
|from Dance Dance Revolution SuperNova|- style="background:#999;"
|"GIVE ME UP"
|LH MUSIC CREATION
|from Dance Dance Revolution SuperNova|- style="background:#999;"
|"I'll Make Love To You"
|LH MUSIC CREATION
|from Dance Dance Revolution SuperNova|- style="background:#999;"
|"JERK IT OUT"
|CAESARS
|from Dance Dance Revolution SuperNova|- style="background:#999;"
|"LONG TRAIN RUNNIN'"
|X-TREME
|from Dance Dance Revolution SuperNova|- style="background:#999;"
|"LOVE AT FIRST SIGHT (TwinMasterplan Mix)"
|KYLIE MINOGUE
|from Dance Dance Revolution SuperNova|- style="background:#999;"
|"MODERN GIRL"
|SHEENA EASTON
|from Dance Dance Revolution SuperNova|- style="background:#999;"
|"MR. DABADA (Groove Wonder remix)"
|CARLOS JEAN
|from Dance Dance Revolution SuperNova|- style="background:#999;"
|"SURRENDER (YOUR LOVE)"
|JAVINE
|from Dance Dance Revolution SuperNova|- style="background:#999;"
|"TOXIC (FT company Edit)"
|HELEN
|from Dance Dance Revolution SuperNova|- style="background:#999;"
|"WHAT A WONDERFUL WORLD"
|BEATBOX vs DJ MIKO
|from Dance Dance Revolution SuperNova|- style="background:#999;"
|"WOOKIE WOOKIE"
|MACHOMAN
|from Dance Dance Revolution SuperNova|- style="background:#999;"
|"DYNAMITE RAVE (Down Bird SOTA Mix)" 
|NAOKI
|from Dance Dance Revolution Extreme|- style="background:#999;"
|"DYNAMITE RAVE (B4 ZA BEAT MIX)" 
|NAOKI
|from DDRMAX2 Dance Dance Revolution 7thMix|- style="background:#999;"
|"true... (radio edit)"
|小坂りゆ
|from DDRMAX Dance Dance Revolution 6thMix|- style="background:#999;"
|"true... (Trance Sunrise Mix)"
|小坂りゆ
|from DDRMAX Dance Dance Revolution 6thMix|- style="background:#999;"
|"END OF THE CENTURY" 
|NO.9
|from Dance Dance Revolution 3rdMix|-
!colspan="3" style="background:#ffffff;"|Absent outside of Asia (2 total)
|-style="background:#999;"
|"I'm so Happy"
|Ryu☆
|from Dance Dance Revolution X2|-style="background:#999;"
|"Theory of Eternity"
|TAG
|from Dance Dance Revolution X2|}

Notes
  This song was absent in the North American and European releases of Dance Dance Revolution X.
 🎬 This song has a music video which is played full-screen.
 🎬 (BG) This song has a music video which is played in an in-game background dance stage.
 💿 This song originates from DDR X2 for the PlayStation 2, and from DDR Hottest Party 3'' for the Wii.

Courses
In Course Mode, players go through anywhere from four to seven songs with no breaks. Players may set options before a course is played, but not midway between songs. There are two kinds of courses: ordinary courses and drill courses. Ordinary courses offer two difficulties: Normal and Difficult. The dance gauge used is different between ordinary courses; those with five songs use the normal dance gauge, while those with six or seven songs use the battery dance gauge, where scoring a "Good", "Miss", or "N.G." judgment step will drain a non-renewable bar. In Normal difficulty, players start with eight bars, while Difficult only gives them four bars. As for drill courses, all of them contain four songs, there is only one difficulty option, and the songs are different between Single and Double Style. In the drill course list, the colors yellow, fuchsia, green, and navy blue indicate that the song is played on Basic, Difficult, Expert, and Challenge, respectively.

Courses

Drill courses

In popular culture
In the 2012 Disney animated film Wreck-It Ralph, an arcade cabinet of the game can be seen in the opening of the wide-view of Litwak's Arcade during Ralph's speech.

References

External links
DanceDanceRevolution X2 location test site 
DanceDanceRevolution X2 official site 

2010 video games
Arcade video games
Arcade-only video games
Dance Dance Revolution games
Video games developed in Germany
Video games developed in Japan
Video games developed in the United States
Multiplayer and single-player video games